Barragem de Poilão is a dam located in the eastern part of the island of Santiago, Cape Verde, in the municipality of São Lourenço dos Órgãos. It impounds the stream Ribeira Seca, the island's largest river. the reservoir, used for irrigation, stretches between the villages Poilão and Levada. North of the reservoir is the national road from João Teves to Achada Fazenda (EN1-ST03).

Specifications
The brick dam was completed in July 2006. Its maximum length is 1,235 m, and its maximum surface area is 17 ha. Its surface level is 118 m above sea level, and its depth at the dam is 18 m. The island has a dry climate with occasional torrential downpours. These cause the transport of large quantities of sediment into the reservoir and a study has found that between 2006 and 2013, the storage capacity of the reservoir has been reduced by almost one half.

See also
List of buildings and structures in Santiago, Cape Verde

References

Santa Cruz, Cape Verde
São Lourenço dos Órgãos
Buildings and structures in Santiago, Cape Verde
Dams completed in 2006
Gravity dams
Dams in Cape Verde